Siege of Mandu may refer to:

 1303 Siege of Mandu
 1440 Siege of Mandu